Annabel Brooks (born 1962) is a British actress who has appeared on television and in films since the 1980s.

Biography
Her first on-screen role came in 1987 when she appeared as Eliza in Nightflyers. She has since appeared in productions including A Handful of Dust, The Witches and Last Run.

In 1981 Brooks married English director Damian Harris. They have one child together, daughter Ella. Later the couple divorced and Brooks married James Dearden.

Filmography
 The Needs of Kim Stanley (2005) – herself
 Last Run (2001) – Tina
 Sam's Game, episode "Mumma's" (2001) TV episode – Julie
 Mauvaise passe (aka The Escort or The Wrong Blonde) (1999) – Annie
 Plunkett & Macleane (1999) – Widow with Garter
 Love Is the Devil: Study for a Portrait of Francis Bacon (1998) – Henrietta Moraes
 Princess Caraboo (1994) – Lady Neville
 The Witches (1990) – Nicola Cuttle
 Dealers (1989) – Lucy
 Paris by Night (1988) – Girl at Gillvray's Office
 A Handful of Dust (1988) – Daisy
 Cherry 2000 (1987) – Glu Glu Club Patron
 Nightflyers (1987) – Eliza

References

External links

1962 births
Living people
British actresses
British film actresses
British television actresses